This is a summary of the electoral history of Alex Salmond, the former First Minister of Scotland from 2007 to 2014 and Leader of the Scottish National Party from 2004 to 2014 and 1990 to 2001, and a Member of the Scottish Parliament and a Member of the UK Parliament for various constituencies since 1987.

UK Parliamentary elections

1987 UK Parliament election

1992 UK Parliament election

1997 UK Parliament election

2001 UK Parliament election

2005 UK Parliament election

2015 UK Parliament election

2017 UK Parliament election

Scottish Parliamentary elections

1999 Scottish Parliament election

2007 Scottish Parliament election

2011 Scottish Parliament election

References 

Alex Salmond
Scottish politicians
Electoral history of British politicians